Lucian Grigorescu (1 February 1894, Medgidia – 28 October 1965, Bucharest) was a Romanian post-impressionist painter. 

He graduated from the Mircea cel Bătrân High School in Constanța.
In 1948, he was elected corresponding member of the Romanian Academy.

References

External links 
Biography

1894 births
1965 deaths
People from Medgidia
Corresponding members of the Romanian Academy
Alumni of the Académie de la Grande Chaumière
20th-century Romanian painters
Mircea cel Bătrân National College (Constanța) alumni